Lankadesmus cognatus is a species of millipedes in the family Fuhrmannodesmidae. It is endemic to Sri Lanka.

References

Polydesmida
Animals described in 1865
Millipedes of Asia
Endemic fauna of Sri Lanka
Arthropods of Sri Lanka